Sethu Kshetram is a Hindu temple complex located at Porur on the Mount-Poonamallee Road, Chennai, Tamilnadu, India. Located within the campus of the W. S. Industries, the temple has shrines to Ganapathi and Ayyappan. The complex originated as a Ganapati temple built for the employees of W. S. in 1964. The foundation stone was laid by the Shankaracharya of Sringeri.

See also
 Religion in Chennai

Notes 

Hindu temples in Chennai